Oshib is a rural locality (a selo) and the administrative center of Oshibskoye Rural Settlement, Kudymkarsky District, Perm Krai, Russia. The population was 536 as of 2010. There are 26 streets.

Geography 
Oshib is located 31 km northeast of Kudymkar (the district's administrative centre) by road. Rocheva is the nearest rural locality.

References 

Rural localities in Kudymkarsky District